Alaeddin Mosque, also known as Alaaddin Mosque ( or Alaaddin Camii) is a historic mosque in Odunpazarı district of Eskişehir Province, Turkey.

Alaeddin Mosque is situated in Alaeddin Park at Odunpazarı, Eskişehir. According to an inscription at the base of its minaret, it was built in 1267, during the reign of Seljuq Sultan of Rûm Gıyaseddin Keyhüsrev III (reigned 1265–1284). It was donated by Cacaoğlu Cibril or Cacaoğlu Nureddin, a follower of Mevlana. It is so one of the oldest buildings in Eskişehir.

The almost-quadratic rectangular-plan mosque is constructed in rubble masonry. An octagonal -diameter dome sits in the middle of the flat wooden roof. Entrance to the mosque is at the northern side. A wooden staircase leads to the women's section in the upper floor. The dome's interior is adorned with Quran verses at its border. The mihrab is placed in a niche in the south of the mosque, and features  late Ottoman architectural style. The mosque is brightened by big rectangular windows. Two-level window layout is applied at the north and lateral facades, at the women's section and the narthex.

The building completely lost its original construction properties after several restorations. A major alteration took place in 1945. The mosque was closed to worship by a cabinet decree, and was used as an archaeological museum until the establishment of the Eskişehir Eti Archaeology Museum. The mosque was restored lately in 2014.

References

Seljuk mosques in Turkey
Mosques completed in 1267
Odunpazarı
Buildings and structures in Eskişehir Province